Dhaai Akshar Prem Ke is a 2000 Indian Hindi-language romantic drama film. It was the first of seven films which starred real-life couple Abhishek Bachchan and Aishwarya Rai Bachchan. The film is a remake of the 1995 Hollywood film A Walk in the Clouds.

Plot 
The plot revolves around a young girl Sahiba who witnesses the brutal murder of a young woman inside her college campus. The perpetrators follow her as she tries to flee home. She is rescued by Karan, an army captain, who sees the men assaulting her at the train station. During the journey, Sahiba reveals that she is in a very difficult spot. She cannot go back to college because the murderers will be looking for her. And she does not want to go home because she had jokingly told her aunt on the phone that she has gotten married in the city. Her parents now expect her to come home with her husband. She does not want to go home and face their wrath. Karan offers to escort her home.

However, when Sahiba arrives home with Karan her family mistakes him for her husband. The two do not get a chance to clarify the situation. The next day when Karan tries to leave, Sahiba's grandmother thinks he is abandoning her granddaughter and has a heart attack. Karan decides to stay and pretend that he is Sahiba's husband until the grandmother recovers. Sahiba falls in love with Karan over the next few days. However, Karan wants to leave and return home to the girl he loves.

Sahiba's father, Yogi is livid when Karan eventually leaves and Sahiba tells everyone the truth. He arranges her marriage to Vicky, the son of a family friend Rai Singhal. On the day of the engagement, Sahiba finds out that Vicky is none other than the man who murdered the girl in her hostel. She tries telling her father but he refuses to believe her.

In the meantime, Karan realizes that he loves Sahiba and returns to her house. However, Yogi slaps him and tells him to leave.

Raunaq, Sahiba's uncle, believes her and helps her meet Karan secretly. Karan promises to rescue Sahiba. He proves to Yogi that Vicky and his father only want his daughter for her inheritance. And that they plan on killing her after the marriage because she witnessed the murder. Vicky and his father attack Yogi and Karan when they realize that they have been exposed. They tie up Yogi and Karan in Yogi's factory and set it on fire. However, the two escape and proceed to stop Vicky and Sahiba's wedding. Just as things start looking up Sahiba collapses. Having given up on Karan, she had consumed poison before the wedding ceremony. She is rushed to the hospital and manages to survive. When she regains her consciousness, she is reunited with Karan.

The movie ends with a married and expecting Sahiba being rushed to hospital, as she is in labor, by her husband Karan as he announces they are having a daughter.

Cast 
 Abhishek Bachchan as Captain Karan Khanna
 Aishwarya Rai Bachchan as Sahiba Grewal
 Dalip Tahil as Rai Bahadur Tejeshwar Singhal
 Amrish Puri as Yogvendra "Yogi" Grewal
 Anupam Kher as Raunaq Grewal
 Shakti Kapoor as Pritam Grewal
 Sushma Seth as Yogi's mom
 Inder Sudan as Vickey Singhal (Tejeshwar's son)
 Tanvi Azmi as Simran Grewal
 Himani Shivpuri as Sweety S. Grewal
 Sonali Bendre as Nisha
 Hrishikesh Pandey as Sameer (Sam) (Nisha's husband)
 Salman Khan as Truck Driver (special appearance)

Soundtrack
The movie did not do well critically and commercially, but the soundtrack of the film became very popular. The lyrics were penned by Sameer. All the songs were sung by Anuradha Paudwal along with Babul Supriyo, KK & Sudesh Bhosle

References

External links 
 
 Bollywood Hungama review
 Rediff review

2000 films
Indian romantic drama films
2000s Hindi-language films
Films scored by Jatin–Lalit
Indian remakes of American films
Films directed by Raj Kanwar
Films based on Four Steps in the Clouds